Wild Metal Country is an action video game developed by DMA Design. The game was published by Gremlin Interactive and released for Microsoft Windows in May 1999. A Dreamcast port, known as Wild Metal, was released in February 2000 by Rockstar Games, which later also re-released the Windows version.

Gameplay 

Wild Metal Country is an action game designed for single-player or multiplayer play, where the player can choose different types of tanks and fight with other tanks on different planets.

Plot 
The game takes place in three planets of a Theric system where machines have gone out of control. They drove out the human population and took over the planets. The humans have finally regained the strength to recover their planets. In single player, the mission is to destroy the enemy, and, more importantly, recover the stolen power cores. In multiplayer mode, all the power cores in one of the other planets have been recovered. The team of bounty hunters that recovered them are now fighting among themselves for the loot and the credit.

Release 
Wild Metal Country was released for Microsoft Windows by Gremlin Interactive in Europe on 15 May 1999. In co-operation with Matrox, subsequent releases of the game added bump mapping to enhance the game's graphical fidelity. A Dreamcast port, under the name Wild Metal, was released by Rockstar Games on 1 February 2000. In January 2004, the Windows version of the game, enhanced with compatibility for modern hardware, was re-released as part of Rockstar Games' "Rockstar Classics" series of freeware games, which had already included 1997's Grand Theft Auto and was available on the company's website. Alongside Rockstar Games' entire catalogue of Windows games, Wild Metal Country was also released on digital distribution platform Steam in January 2008.

Reception 

Wild Metal Country and Wild Metal both received mixed reviews. Writing for games website GameSpot, Ben Stahl concluded his review of the Dreamcast version with "this game had plenty of potential, but it turned out to be a boring shooter so frustrating that it's hardly worth a rental". Greg Orlando of Next Generation said of the same console version, "War is hell, kid, and sometimes it's pretty darn ugly, too. But we sort of enjoy the smell of Wild Metal in the morning."

References

Further reading

External links 
 

1999 video games
Action video games
DMA Design games
Dreamcast games
Freeware games
Gremlin Interactive games
Multiplayer and single-player video games
Rockstar Games games
Tank simulation video games
Video games developed in the United Kingdom
Windows games